The  is a bridge over the Toyo River (Toyo-gawa) in Japan.  It connects the cities of Toyohashi and Toyokawa in Aichi Prefecture. The bridge carries Route 23 across the river.

Bridges in Japan